Sir Walter Morley Fletcher,   (21 July 1873 – 7 June 1933) was a British physiologist and administrator. Fletcher graduated from Trinity College, Cambridge and was most significant in his administration of the Medical Research Council (MRC) during the interwar years. Under his guidance, the MRC focused its funding on basic scientific research at the expense of clinical research but he made Britain a leader in biomedical research in the period.

References

Knights Commander of the Order of the British Empire
British Congregationalists
1873 births
1933 deaths
Fellows of the Royal Society